Rohan Bopanna and Aisam-ul-Haq Qureshi were the defending champions but decided not to participate together.
Bopanna played alongside Mahesh Bhupathi and successfully defended the title, defeating Qureshi and his partner Jean-Julien Rojer 7–6(8–6), 6–3 in the final.

Seeds

Draw

Finals

Top half

Bottom half

References
 Main Draw

BNP Paribas Masters - Doubles
2012 Doubles